Richard Charles Francis Christian Meade, 3rd Earl of Clanwilliam GCH (15 August 1795 – 7 October 1879), styled Lord Gillford between 1800 and 1805, was a British diplomat and politician.

Background and education
Meade was the only son of Richard Meade, 2nd Earl of Clanwilliam, and Caroline, Countess Thun, and succeeded in the earldom at the age of ten. His early years were spent in Vienna, where his father had moved after a series of bitter quarrels with his own parents about his marriage and about their enormous debts, which deprived him of what should have been a great inheritance. After his father's death Richard was raised by relatives in England.  He was educated at Eton.

In his 1848 memoirs, François-René de Chateaubriand writes of Meade that "at the head of the younger [London dandies of the 1820s] . . . Lord Clanwilliam was prominent, the son, it was said, of the Duc de Richelieu. He did wonderful things: he rode his horse to Richmond, and returned to Almack's having fallen off twice. He had a certain trick of speaking in the manner of Alcibiades, which delighted."

Diplomatic and political career
Lord Clanwilliam joined the Diplomatic Service. He attended Lord Castlereagh's suite at the Congress of Vienna in 1814 and was his private secretary from January 1817 to July 1819 in the latter's capacity as Foreign Secretary. He was one of the first people to see Castlereagh's widow after his suicide. It was he who was largely responsible for the decision to give Lord Castlereagh an official funeral in Westminster Abbey. He was one of many witnesses who later testified to Castlereagh's increasingly strange mental condition in the days before his suicide.

He was formally appointed Under-Secretary of State for Foreign Affairs in 1822 after having acted in this role for a year and a half. However, he shortly thereafter resigned this role to become chef de chancellerie to the Duke of Wellington's mission at the Congress of Verona. He served as Envoy to Berlin from February 1823 to December 1827. In 1826 he was created grand cross of the Royal Guelphic Order and in 1828 Baron Clanwilliam, of Clanwilliam in the County of Tipperary, in the Peerage of the United Kingdom.

He was conferred a Doctor of Civil Law from Oxford University in 1834. In 1847 he was awarded the honorary position of Captain of Deal Castle, which he held until his death. He died at 32 Belgrave Square in London on 7 October 1879. His papers are held by the National Library of Ireland.

Family
Lord Clanwilliam married Lady Elizabeth Herbert (1809–1858), daughter of George Herbert, 11th Earl of Pembroke, on 3 July 1830; the couple had one daughter and four sons. He was succeeded by his eldest son, Richard. His second son, Sir Robert Henry Meade, later achieved distinction as Permanent Under-Secretary of the Colonial Office. His second youngest son Sidney Meade (1839-1917) was Perpetual Curate of Christ Church in Bradford on Avon from 1882, Canon of Salisbury Cathedral and Justice of the Peace for Wiltshire.

References

Further reading
Chateaubriand, Francois-Rene, Vicomte de. "Memoirs d'outre-tombe." Paris: Nelson, 1911.

External links

1795 births
1879 deaths
Captains of Deal Castle
Earls of Clanwilliam
Irish people of German descent
People educated at Eton College
Thun und Hohenstein
Peers of the United Kingdom created by George IV